This is a list of the complete operas of the German opera composer Friedrich von Flotow (1812–1883).

List

References
Sources
Cohen, Peter (1992), 'Flotow, Friedrich' in The New Grove Dictionary of Opera, ed. Stanley Sadie (London) 
Some of the information in this article is taken from the Dutch Wikipedia article.

 
Lists of operas by composer
Lists of compositions by composer